Nerses Hovhannisyan (12 October 1938 – 23 October 2016), was an Armenian film director, actor and screenwriter. He graduated from the Directing Department of Yerevan Fine Arts and Theatre Institute in 1959. From that time on he worked at Armenfilm Studios. Between 1966-1967 he assisted Russian director Yuli Raizman during the shooting of Tvoy sovremennik (1967). In addition to his career directing, Hovhannisyan occasionally acted roles in Armenian films.

Filmography
1968 - A Meeting at an Exhibition, short
1969 - Attention, It Is Raisman Shooting, script, dir., doc.
1969 - Watch Out, an Animal, doc.
1969 - Panos the Clumsy
1971 - Avetik Isahakyan, doc.
1972 - A Meeting with Professor Badalyan, doc.
1973 - An Hour Before the Dawn, co-dir. (dir. E.Karamyan)
1975 - A Bride from the North
1977 - Cooks Arrived for Competition, co-script, dir.
1979 - Live Long (as Benik)
1980 - The Big Win (starring)
1980 - The Flight Starts from the Earth, co-script, dir.
1981 - Business Trip to Sanatorium (as Artyusha)
1982 - The Mechanics of Happiness
1985 - Hosted by the Commander, co-script, co-dir. (along with H.Khachatryan)
1985 - The Last Sunday (as Movses)
1986 - A Lonely Nut-Tree (as Hovsep)
1986 - Strange Games, co-script, dir.
1990 - Nostalgia (as Yenok)

References

External links
 

1938 births
2016 deaths
Armenian screenwriters
Armenian film directors
Armenian male film actors
Male actors from Yerevan
Film people from Yerevan